Maharashtriya Dnyanakosha(Devanagari:महाराष्ट्रीय ज्ञानकोश, IAST:Mahārāṣṭrīya dñyānakośa) is the first encyclopaedia in the Marathi language. Shridhar Venkatesh Ketkar was the chief editor the encyclopedia. Work began in 1916 and it was completed in 1928.

Structure
The encyclopaedia was published in 23 volumes. The first five volumes are introductory, and consist of a series of lengthy articles on various sociological and historical subjects. They are titled as follows:
 Volume 1: Hindustan ani Jaga (हिंदुस्तान अाणि जग, India and the World)
 Volume 2: Vedavidya (वेदविद्या, Vedic Knowledge)
 Volume 3: Buddhapurva Jaga (बुद्धपूर्व जग, The World Before Buddha) 
 Volume 4: Buddhotar Jaga (बुद्धोत्तर जग, The World After Buddha) 
 Volume 5: Vijnanetihas  (विज्ञानेतिहास, History of Sciences)

Volumes 6 through 21 consist of an alphabetically arranged series of short articles (as in a conventional encyclopaedia). Volume 22 is the index (सूची),  and finally volume 23 (Hindusthan, हिंदुस्थान) contains some additional information about India.

Availability on the internet
The entire encyclopedia is made available on the internet by Yashwantrao Chavan Pratishthan, Mumbai. Some articles are updated. As of 09/October/2021 the website is private and requires User ID and Password for login.

Citations

External links
Official Site : Ketkar Dnyanakosh online

Marathi encyclopedias
Indian online encyclopedias
1916 non-fiction books
20th-century encyclopedias
20th-century Indian books